Captain General has been the highest rank in the Spanish Army (Ejército de Tierra) since the 18th century. A five-star rank with NATO code OF-10, it is equivalent to a field marshal of the armies of numerous countries, a general of the Army of the United States, a captain general of the Spanish Navy (Armada Española) or a Captain general of the Air Force in the Spanish Air and Space Force (Ejército del Aire y del Espacio). A Captain General's insignia consists of two command sticks under five four-pointed stars below the Royal Crown.

A personal rank of captain general was created in the Spanish Army (and Navy) as the highest rank in the hierarchy, not unlike the Marechal de France. Since King Charles IV's reign (1788–1808), the monarchs used captain general insignia when wearing uniform. Briefly abolished by the Second Spanish Republic (except one honorary promotion), it was restored by Nationalist Spain in 1938; Francisco Franco himself was the only officer of this rank. The effective rank was reserved to the reigning monarch. A few posthumous honorary promotions and honorary promotions of retired officers to this rank were also made, such as José Moscardó Ituarte (1956), Agustín Muñoz Grandes (1957), Camilo Alonso Vega (1969) or Manuel Gutiérrez Mellado (1994). Some members of the Spanish Royal Family were promoted to the rank after periods of service and Queen Isabella II appointed her consort, Francis of Assisi (1846). Two foreign monarchs, Edward VII of the United Kingdom and William II of Germany, and four distinguished foreign military officers also held the honour.

Insignia history

List of Captains general

See also 
Army of Spain
Captain general
Captain general of the Air Force
Captain general of the Navy

Notes

References

Citations

Sources 

 List of captain generals of the Spanish Army ASAVE 
 Guaita Martorell, Aurelio. ''Capitanes y capitanías generales." Revista de Historia Militar, Nº 65, 1988, pp. 125–172.

 
 Army Captain General
Five-star officers